Christian Collardot (5 July 1933 – 12 June 2011) was a French long jumper who competed in the 1960 Summer Olympics.

References

External links
 

1933 births
2011 deaths
French male long jumpers
Olympic athletes of France
Athletes (track and field) at the 1960 Summer Olympics